P. K. Narayana Pillai (21 March 1879 – 10 February 1936), better identified as Sahitya Panchanan P. K. Narayana Pillai, was an Indian literary critic, essayist, scholar, grammarian and poet of Malayalam language. One of the pioneers of literary criticism in Malayalam, he wrote more than 25 books which include Panchananante Vimarssthrayam, a critique of the writings of Thunchaththu Ezhuthachan, Cherusseri Namboothiri and Kunchan Nambiar and two books on Malayalam grammar, Leghuvyakaranam and Vyakarana Pravesika. He was a judge of the High Court of Kerala, a member of the Sree Moolam Popular Assembly and the founder president of the Samastha Kerala Sahithya Parishad.

Biography 
P. K. Narayana Pillai was born on 21 March 1879 at Ambalappuzha in the present-day Alappuzha district of the south Indian state of Kerala to Pozhincheri Madathil Damodaran Pillai and Kadamattuveettil Kunjulakshmi Amma. After completing early education in the traditional way under local teachers such as Chami Pillai Asan, Ananthakrishna Iyer and Raman Asan, he did his formal schooling at Ambalappuzha and passed the 10th standard examination in 1896. His college education was in Thiruvananthapuram where he completed his under graduate studies and after securing a bachelor's degree, he served as a teacher at the government high school and later at the government college in Thiruvananthapuram. Simultaneously, he studied law and after earning a degree, he started practicing as a lawyer in 1909. The next year, he was elected to Sree Moolam Popular Assembly.
After practicing law in Kottayam, Alappuzha and Thiruvananthapram, he became a judge of the High Court of Kerala in 1929. Later, he also represented Ambalappuzha in the Sree Moolam Popular Assembly. When Samastha Kerala Sahithya Parishad was established in Kochi, he was selected as its founder president.

Narayana Pillai published over 25 books, mostly literary criticism, and he was one of the pioneers of literary criticism in Malayalam. Panchananante Vimarsathrayam, a critique on the writings of Thunchaththu Ezhuthachan, Cherusseri Namboothiri and Kunchan Nambiar was one of his major works and the book was published by Kerala Sangeetha Nataka Akademi. He also wrote two books on Malayalam grammar, Leghuvyakaranam and Vyakarana Pravesika. A four-volume work, Sahitya Panchanante Kruthikal has been published compiling all his major works.

Narayana Pillai, married to Parukutty Amma, died on 10 February 1936 at the age of 56. A library, P. K. Memorial Library, one of the first libraries in Kerala, was established in his honour by P. N. Panicker, known to be the father of library movement in Kerala, with Panicker serving as its secretary and it was here the representatives of 47 libraries in the state of Travancore met on 16 September 1945 to form the Thiruvithaamkoor Granthasala Sangham (All Travancore Library Association), the first library movement in Kerala. Incidentally, P. K. Memorial Library was the first entry in the association's register. Sahitya Akademi has published Narayana Pillai's biography under the title, Sahitya Panchanan P K Narayana Pillai, written by M. Gopalakrishnan Nair, under the series, Bharathiya Sahitya Silpikal (The Makers of Indian Literature). T. N. Gopinathan Nair, a noted dramatist, was his son, and Ravi Vallathol, a popular film and television actor, was his grandson.

Selected bibliography

See also 

 List of Malayalam-language authors by category
 List of Malayalam-language authors

References

Further reading

External links 
 
 

Writers from Kerala
Malayalam-language writers
1879 births
1936 deaths
People from Alappuzha
Malayali people
20th-century Indian linguists
20th-century Indian poets
19th-century Indian poets
19th-century Indian essayists
19th-century Indian linguists
19th-century Indian non-fiction writers
19th-century Indian scholars
20th-century Indian non-fiction writers
20th-century Indian essayists
20th-century Indian scholars
Judges of the Kerala High Court
20th-century Indian lawyers
20th-century Indian politicians
Recipients of the Sahitya Akademi Award in Sanskrit
Writers in British India